The Dentist 2 is a 1998 American psychological slasher film directed by Brian Yuzna and starring Corbin Bernsen, Jillian McWhirter, Jeff Doucette, and Susanne Wright. A sequel to The Dentist  (1996), it is the second installment in The Dentist film series,.

Plot

Dr. Alan Feinstone is in the maximum security mental hospital he was sentenced to at the end of the first film. While talking to the psychiatrist, he remembers the murders he committed in his own mind, while convincing the doctor that it was another man who did those things. His remorseful story distracts her from seeing him pull a sharpened tool that he stitched into his own leg, and he uses her as a hostage to escape. Alan's wife Brooke is alive with new dental implants, despite her missing tongue and inability to speak. She hires an investigator to find out where Alan has escaped to, believing that he had been putting away money before he went crazy. Brooke has in her possession some postcards that Alan had left behind, and she believes he is in one of those places.

Alan winds up in the small town of Paradise, Missouri, pretending that he had grown upset at life in the big city. He uses a previously established false identity of Dr. Lawrence Caine, and has a bank account where he had been sending the money he skimmed off from his practice to hide from the IRS. The bank officer Mr. Wilkes introduces Alan to his niece Jamie, hoping that she can rent out her small cottage for "Larry" to live in so she could collect money from it.

Jamie, who physically resembles Brooke, becomes a target of Alan's affections. When he has problems with a cap on one of his teeth, Alan visits the inept town dentist, Dr. Burns, whom he takes an instant disliking to. Alan threatens Dr. Burns with a golf club, causing him to accidentally fall down the stairs to his death. Mr. Wilkes convinces Alan that he should take over as the new dentist for Paradise; Alan soon resumes his murderous ways with a passing tourist (Clint Howard) who accidentally recognizes him from Los Angeles.

As the private detective tracks Alan down to Paradise, Alan learns that Jamie has an admirer named Robbie, who also is the drywall contractor hired to finish his new office. Alan's jealousy causes him to ruin a romantic dinner when it is interrupted by a call from Robbie on her answering machine, despite Jamie's insistence that she only thinks of Robbie as a friend. Meanwhile, Beverley, a teller at the bank, has doubts about "Larry" and finds out his real identity while researching on the computer.

Beverley sets up an appointment to tell him she knows the truth, but when she asks too many questions he realizes that she knows something. He goes behind her and sedates her with nitrous oxide. She finds herself duct taped to the dental chair and cries and begs him to let her go. He puts a mouth clamp in her mouth to keep it open and drills her bottom-right molar tooth to the raw nerve as a "lie detector" to find out who else she has told. If she lied, he would take a sharp plaque scraping hook and painfully force it into the nerve of the tooth he drilled, wiggling the tooth hard at the same time. He repeatedly jams the hook into the exposed nerve causing Beverly tremendous pain. Robbie comes to install some more drywall and rings the office door bell, leaving Alan no choice but to pause his torture session and answer the door. Robbie asks to come in and after Beverley screams Robbie goes rushing to check on her. Just as Robbie is about to rescue her, Feinstone attacks him from outside the doorway. In the ensuing fight, Alan kills Robbie with a hammer, turns back to Beverley and re-tapes her to the dental chair. He takes a pair of dental pliers and plays a game of "truth or tooth". He asks her what did she tell Jeremy about Washington but he doesn't believe her then pulls out her left front tooth, then he asks her what she did tell Jamie. He then attempts to pull her left incisor tooth out, but instead he breaks it by accident which angers Feinstone even more. Alan then painfully drills one of her bottom front teeth down to the nerve, and continues to drill so hard that the dental clamp holding her mouth slips out from the pressure he's applying. Then, out of a final act of desperation and what seems to be her only defense, she bites down hard on the drill causing it to lock up and jam inside her teeth. Infuriated, the mad dentist tells her he has a much better idea, and that he will cut the drill out of her mouth. She then screams, and the scene comes to a close.

Later that night Alan begins to have his obsessive-compulsive visions of germs and decay again after seeing his blood-stained uniform. Suddenly Brooke appears, and begins to seduce him into one of his chairs; just before she can cut his tongue off with a pair of scissors, Jamie knocks her out with an overhead lamp. However, as Jamie is calling the police about Brooke, she spots the bloody hatchet, and opens a closet door to find Robbie's and Beverley's maimed corpses.

Alan turns on Jamie and a fight ensues, with him chasing her to an upstairs bathroom and finally overpowering her. He takes her to an unfinished room in the office, which in his mind is spotless, germ-free and pure white, with opera music playing, and picks up an electric drill (which in his mind is a dental drill) and tries to drill her teeth. Jamie escapes and hides, until Brooke has revived and she and Jamie trap Alan in a hallway. Brooke lunges to stab him with a pair of scissors, but Jamie inadvertently hits her over the head with a 2x4, killing her.

Alan finds Jamie hiding behind some drywall, and after banter between the two, Jamie fires a nail gun repeatedly and hits him with numerous nails. Stunned, Alan walks downstairs into the midst of a surprise welcome party being given to him by the people of Paradise. Alan calmly exits out the front door, leaving the townpeople shocked and Jamie to recover from what just happened. Alan drives off into the night with numerous nails embedded in his head and shoulders. He begins to pull them out, using one as a toothpick for his cap which was lost in his fights with Jamie and Brooke, and maniacally laughs repeatedly.

Cast

Release
The Dentist 2 was released directly to television, premiering on HBO on December 11, 1998.

Critical response
Rotten Tomatoes reports that 0% of five surveyed critics gave the film a positive review; the average rating is 3.70/10. Allmovie's review of the film was negative, writing "this perfunctory sequel repeats those earlier grotesqueries [from The Dentist] pretty much shot for shot".

Accolades
Brian Yuzna was nominated for Best Film at the 1998 Sitges Film Festival.

Notes

References

External links

 
 

1998 films
1998 crime thriller films
1998 horror films
1990s American films
1990s English-language films
1990s horror thriller films
1990s serial killer films
1990s slasher films
American crime thriller films
American horror thriller films
American sequel films
American serial killer films
American slasher films
Crime horror films
Films about dentistry
Films about medical malpractice
Films directed by Brian Yuzna
Films scored by Alan Howarth (composer)
Trimark Pictures films